The Eleanor Cabot Bradley Estate is a nonprofit country house and garden ground museum in Canton, Massachusetts. It is operated by The Trustees of Reservations. The grounds are open every day, sunrise to sunset, without charge.

History
In 1902, Dr. Arthur Tracey Cabot (b. 1852 in Boston to Dr. Samuel Cabot III and Hannah Lowell Jackson Cabot) hired architect Charles A. Platt to design a country house with landscaping and outlying farm buildings. Its formal grounds include lawns, a walled garden, and a parterre. Dr. Cabot had seven siblings, but no children. The estate was passed on to his niece, Eleanor Cabot (daughter of his brother, Godfrey Lowell Cabot), who married Major Ralph Bradley in 1919.

In 1945, she added ponds, a camellia house and greenhouse, and planted specimen trees.

The property was acquired through a bequest of Eleanor Cabot Bradley in 1991.

Gallery

References

External links
The Trustees of Reservation: Bradley Estate

Cabot family
The Trustees of Reservations
Houses in Norfolk County, Massachusetts
Historic house museums in Massachusetts
Parks in Norfolk County, Massachusetts
Buildings and structures in Canton, Massachusetts
Protected areas established in 1991
1991 establishments in Massachusetts

Gardens in Massachusetts